Josef Peukert (22 January 1855 – 3 March 1910) was a German Bohemian anarchist known for his autobiographical book Memoirs from the proletarian revolutionary labour movement.  The book provided a glimpse into the early days of the radical labour movement in Austria, the start of the anarchist movement in Germany and the exile of the anarchists in London and America at the time of Socialist Law (1878–1890).  The accuracy of the book was questioned by fellow anarchist and historian Max Nettlau, who looked upon it in a "highly-skeptical" manner.

Early life
Peukert grew up poor at Albrechtsdorf an der Adler in the  Kingdom of Bohemia, a crown land of the  Austrian Empire. From the age of six, he worked for his father's company and the age of eleven he was taken out of school. At the age of 16 he left home and worked odd jobs in Germany.  Peukert contributed to social democratic workers' associations later becoming an Anarchist communist.

Career
In exile in London, Peukert became involved in distributing Freiheit published by Johann Most, but became increasingly critical of Most as Social-Revolutionist as opposed to an anarchist.  During this time he became even more radicalized and upon his return in the 1880s he became the leader of the radical Fraktion, who were believers in the concept of Propaganda of the deed, which calls for the use of terror against society civil rights.

In the early 1880s, Peukert became the editor of Die Zukunft, published by Der Rebell, from 1886 to 1893 he was the editor of Die Autonomie and co-editor after 1889 of Der Anarchist.

A so-called civil war within the Socialist League began because of Peukert's friendship with Theodor Reuss.  Victor Dave, head of a rival anarchist grouping in London, did not trust Reuss which led to tension with Peukert.  In 1887, Peukert went with Reuss to Belgium, where Reuss passed information to the police leading to the arrest of Johann Neve.  Neve was arrested and sentenced to 15 years in prison.  The episode severely damaged the reputation of Peukert, and also Dave. This incident is touched upon in John Henry Mackay's Die Anarchisten.

From 1890 he worked with Emma Goldman for several years in New York City.

Works
 
 Archive of Josef Peukert Papers at the International Institute of Social History

References

1855 births
1910 deaths
19th-century Austrian people
American anarchists
American people of Austrian descent
American people of German Bohemian descent
Anarcho-communists
Austrian anarchists
Austro-Hungarian emigrants to the United States
German Bohemian people
People from the Kingdom of Bohemia
People from Rychnov nad Kněžnou District